Gavin Kerr is a retired rugby union footballer who played prop, he played international rugby for Scotland. He played club rugby for Leeds Tykes (now Leeds Carnegie), the defunct Border Reivers, Edinburgh and Sale Sharks. He played both sides of the scrum. During his time at Leeds he helped them win the 2004–05 Powergen Cup, the final of which he started.

He debuted for Scotland in the February 2003 game against Ireland but became a regular starter for Scotland after his solid performance against New Zealand in the Autumn Test series, replacing Tom Smith after his retirement.

In April 2009 it was announced that Kerr will play for English club Sale Sharks in the Guinness Premiership. He signed a two-year deal keeping him at the Stockport based club for the 2009–10 and 2010–11 seasons. On 18 August 2010, Kerr announced he would retire from rugby due to a neck injury. Kerr currently works as a Chartered Building Surveyor.

Honours
Powergen Cup/Anglo-Welsh Cup titles: 1
2005

References

External links
Leeds profile
Scotland profile

See also
 2003 Rugby World Cup
 Scotland national rugby union team
 Rugby World Cup 2003 try scorers

1977 births
Living people
Rugby union players from Newcastle upon Tyne
People from Berwick-upon-Tweed
Rugby union players from Northumberland
Scottish rugby union players
Scotland international rugby union players
Leeds Tykes players
Sale Sharks players
Jed-Forest RFC players
Berwick RFC players
Chartered Building Surveyors
Home inspection
Rugby union props